The following is a list of highest grossing Philippine films.
 Color key
 – is an entry film for Metro Manila Film Festival.

Eight hundred million mark

Six hundred million mark

Five hundred million mark

 A Second Chance grossed over ₱480 million domestically while its total box office gross including the sales abroad is ₱556 million.
 The Super Parental Guardians grossed over ₱570 million domestically while its total box office gross including international sales is ₱999 million.

Four hundred million mark

Three hundred million mark

 
The Unkabogable Praybeyt Benjamin is the first Filipino film to break the  mark at the box office.

Two hundred million mark

One hundred million mark

See also
 List of highest-grossing films in the Philippines

References

Philippines
Lists of Philippine films
|}